is the 12th studio album by Chara, which was released on June 25, 2008. It debuted at #12 on the Japanese Oricon album charts, and charted in the top 300 for 10 weeks.

Honey was released in two versions: a limited edition CD+DVD version as well as a regular CD Only version. The DVD featured the music videos for the three physical singles, Cherry Cherry, Boku no Koto o Shitte and Trophy, along with the music video for the digital download song Labrador. Missing are the videos for X'mas Spirit!, the B-side of Boku no Koto o Shitte, and Call Me.

The album is filled with tie-up songs. The single Trophy was used in commercials for the Toyota bB car, and Cherry Cherry was used in childrearing information kit Kodomo Challenge commercials. Ai o Oboeru was used in Kodomo Challenge commercials promoting the birthday anniversary release of the kit. Call Me was used as the theme song for the news show News Zero, and Aoi Kakera was used as the opening theme song for the anime Telepathy Shōjo Ran.

Labrador was written for Chara by rock band Radwimps' vocalist Yōjirō Noda. It was released as a radio single from Honey and reached #67 on the Billboard Japan Singles Top 100 chart.

Chara's daughter Sumire is featured on the cover of the album.

Track listing

Singles

Japan Sales Rankings

References
 	

Chara (singer) albums
2008 albums